Knolton is a hamlet in Wrexham County Borough, Wales, close to the border with Shropshire, England. It is in Overton parish, and is 5½ miles ENE of Chirk.

The Kynaston family has its seat at Knolton Hall, a Grade II* listed building.

The Trotting Mare Inn, a public house in Knolton, has the distinction of being in Wales, while its adjacent car park is in England.

References 

Villages in Wrexham County Borough